The 1910–11 Scottish Division One season was won by Rangers by four points over nearest rival Aberdeen.

League table

Results

References

Scottish Football Archive

1910–11 Scottish Football League
Scottish Division One seasons
Scottish